Thomas Maschmeyer  is a German chemist and a Professor of Chemistry at the University of Sydney. He is the Founding Director of the Australian Institute for Nanoscale Science and Technology, Laboratory of Advanced Catalysis for Sustainability, and University of Sydney Energy Storage Research Network. He has published several highly cited articles and books.

Aside from being an Elected Fellow of the Royal Society of New South Wales, he also holds the Honorary Distinguished Professorship at University of Cardiff and was also previously an Australian Bicentennial Fellow at the Royal Institution in 1994, working with John Meurig Thomas; and was also previously Vice-Chairman of the Delft Institute of Chemical Technology at Delft University of Technology.

In 2011 he was elected a Fellow of the Australian Academy of Science. In 2020 he won the Prime Minister's Prize for Innovation.

References

External links
WorldCat

Australian chemists
Australian science writers
Fellows of the Royal Society of New South Wales
Academic staff of the University of Sydney
University of Sydney alumni
1966 births
German emigrants to Australia
Living people
Fellows of the Australian Academy of Science
Fellows of the Australian Academy of Technological Sciences and Engineering